Foveolariidae is a family of bryozoans belonging to the order Cheilostomatida.

Genera:
 Amplexicamera Winston, 2005
 Dactylostega Hayward & Cook, 1983
 Foveolaria Busk, 1884
 Mangana Gordon, 2014
 Odontionella Canu & Bassler, 1917

References

Cheilostomatida